The 2002 Canadian Professional Soccer League season was the fifth season for the Canadian Professional Soccer League. The season began on May 23, 2002, and concluded on October 20, 2002, with Ottawa Wizards becoming the first expansion franchise to win the CPSL Championship (known as the Rogers CPSL Cup for sponsorship reasons) by defeating the North York Astros 2–0. For the first time the final was hosted at Esther Shiner Stadium, which granted the hosts the North York Astros a wildcard match. As the league was divided into the Eastern and Western Conferences the Wizards clinched the Eastern title, while Toronto Croatia won the Western Conference. The expansion of the league saw the return of professional soccer to Hamilton, and the addition of another Toronto franchise. On February 26, 2002, the CPSL signed a player agreement deal with the Toronto Lynx of the USL A-League, which provided the Lynx access in order to use CPSL talent and provide players an opportunity to play at a higher level.

Changes from 2001 season 
For the second straight season the CPSL expanded to 14 clubs to include the Hamilton Thunder and Metro Lions. Due to the increase of teams the CPSL management split the league into two Conferences the Eastern and Western. The Toronto Olympians moved to Erin Mills, Mississauga, which opened the Scarborough territory to the Metro Lions. Changes occurred in the York Region territory with Glen Shields changing their team name to Vaughan Sun Devils in order to fully represent the city of Vaughan. Meanwhile, their rivals the York Region Shooters were sold to Tony De Thomasis, and relocated the team to their original home at Highland Park in Aurora. While former Hamilton Bulldogs president Cary Kaplan was hired as a Management Consultant for the league.

Teams

Final standings

Eastern Conference

Western Conference

Rogers CPSL Championship playoffs

Wildcard

Semifinals

Rogers CPSL Championship

Rogers CPSL Championship MVP:
Guillermo Compton Hall (North York Astros)

All-Star Game 
The 2002 CPSL All-Star match was arranged by the German consulate general in Toronto to have TSV 1860 Munich of the Bundesliga to come to Canada. London City head coach Jurek Gebcznyski was selected to assemble an All-Star roster with Dave Benning, Victor Cameria and Steve Nijjar serving as his assistant coaches. Jimmy Douglas was appointed the general manager for the team.

2002 scoring leaders
Full article: CSL Golden Boot

CPSL Executive Committee 
A list of the 2002 CPSL Executive Committee.

Individual awards

The annual CPSL awards ceremony was held on October 20, 2002, at the Hollywood Princess Convention in Concord, Ontario. Where the Mississauga Olympians received the most accolades with three wins. Darren Tilley a former English football and  USL A-League veteran was given both the CSL Golden Boot and Rookie of the Year. After accumulating the fewest card bookings they received the Fair Play award, their third in the club's history. Toronto Croatia went home with two awards with George Azcurra adding his third Goalkeeper of the Year award to his resume. While Domagoj Sain was named the Defender of the Year.

Abraham Osman of the Ottawa Wizards became the first player to receive the MVP in two straight seasons. After a mediocre start to the season the Metro Lions utilized the services of Aldwyn McGill as manager, who transformed the expansion franchise into a title contender. While Michael Lambert's work as a match official was recognized by the league with the Referee of the Year award.

References

External links
Rocket Robin's Home Page of the 2002 CPSL Season

2002
Canadian Professional Soccer League
Canadian Professional Soccer League